Streptomyces parvulus is a bacterium species from the genus of Streptomyces which has been isolated from soil. Streptomyces parvulus produces the peptide antibiotic Actinomycin D and the angiogenesis inhibitor borrelidin and manumycin A, himalomycin A, himalomycin B and kynurenine.

Further reading

See also 
 List of Streptomyces species

References

External links
Type strain of Streptomyces parvulus at BacDive -  the Bacterial Diversity Metadatabase	

parvulus
Bacteria described in 1954